Newmarket Soccer Football Club is an Australian football (soccer) club based at Newmarket, an inner north-west suburb of Brisbane, Queensland. The club was founded in 1949 as the Postal Institute Soccer Club, adopting its current name in the mid-1960s. The men's senior team currently competes in Football Brisbane's Capital League 1. Newmarket SFC play in a gold strip (home) and a maroon strip (away). The club's logo has remained the same since foundation and depicts the Greek God Hermes, the patron and protector of athletes and messenger of the gods.

History
The Postal Institute Soccer Club was founded in 1949 and initially based on the southside of Brisbane. The decision to form the club occurred towards the end of 1948 and occurred under the guidance of Henry Seeney and Les Tozer, members of the Postal Institute who had played for the Latrobe and Toombul clubs respectively. The club was placed in Division Five, and lost their first competitive match 5–2 to Mitchelton's reserve team on 2 April 1949. It remained in the lower divisions until winning its first title by topping the Division Four table in 1953. A further promotion saw the club reach Division Two in 1958, where the club remained for seven seasons until it was relegated at the end of the 1964 season.

The club returned to Division Two as the Newmarket Soccer Football Club in 1967, and alternated between Division Two and Three several times during the next ten seasons. Newmarket finished Division Two in fourth place for three consecutive seasons (1979 to 1981) before achieving promotion to Division One in 1982. The 1983 season witnessed Newmarket's best league performance, finishing second in Division One but denied the second promotion spot to the Brisbane Premier League which instead went to third placed Coalstars. From 1983 to 2015, Newmarket completed 33 seasons in either the second or third tier of the Brisbane football structure, during which the highlights included Division Three Grand Final victories in 1993 and 1996.

In 2005, Newmarket achieved their best cup performance, reaching the quarter-finals of the 2005 Brisbane Premier Cup, the only time the club has progressed this far in cup competition.

Between 2011 and 2013 the club lost access to its clubhouse through insect damage which required assistance from the Brisbane City Council to rectify, and resulted in a drop in activity at the club with participation falling from 30 junior teams in 2011 to 17 teams in 2013.

Newmarket SFC was relegated from Capital League 2 in 2015 after losing their final three games, which allowed Slacks Creek and Pine Hills to overtake them in the final three weeks of the season. Newmarket spent two seasons in Capital League 3, finishing sixth on both occasions; however, due to a restructuring of the league at the end of the 2017 season, they were promoted back to Capital League 2.

Source:

The tier is the level in the Australian soccer league system

Honours
Brisbane Division 4 – Premiers 1953
Brisbane Division 2 – Premiers 1982
Brisbane Division 3 – Premiers and Champions 1993
Brisbane Division 3 – Champions 1996

Notable past players
Michael McGowan
Michael Baird
Raymond Attard
Henry Faleye
Shaun Dunleavy
Nathan Minter
Robert Ward
Matthew Mcdonnell

External links

References

Soccer clubs in Brisbane
Association football clubs established in 1949
1949 establishments in Australia
Newmarket, Queensland